The , also known as the Furisode Fire, destroyed 60–70% of the Japanese capital city of Edo (now Tokyo) on March 2, 1657, the third year of the Meireki Imperial era. The fire lasted for three days, and is estimated to have killed over 100,000 people.

Legend
The fire was said to have been started accidentally by a priest who was cremating an allegedly cursed kimono. The kimono had been owned in succession by three teenage girls who all died before ever being able to wear it. When the garment was being burned, a large gust of wind fanned the flames causing the wooden temple to ignite.

Historical account
The fire began on the eighteenth day of the year, in Edo's Hongō district, and spread quickly through the city, due to hurricane-force winds which were blowing from the northwest. Edo, like most Japanese cities and towns at the time, and like most of those in mainland East Asia, was built primarily from wood and paper.  The buildings were especially dry due to a drought the previous year, and the roads and other open spaces between buildings were small and narrow, allowing the fire to spread and grow particularly quickly. (Many cities in Europe had similar problems, being built of flammable material and tightly packed; the Great Fire of London 9 years later was of similar magnitude.) Though Edo had a designated fire brigade, the Hikeshi (火消し, "fire extinguisher"), it had been established only 21 years earlier, and was simply not large enough, experienced enough, or well-equipped enough to face such a conflagration.

On the second evening, the winds changed, and the fire was pushed from the southern edges of the city back towards its center. The homes of the shōgun's closest retainers, in Kōjimachi, were destroyed as the fire made its way towards Edo castle, at the very center of the city. Ultimately, the main keep was saved, but most of the outer buildings, and all of the retainers' and servants' homes were destroyed. Finally, on the third day, the winds died down, as did the flames, but thick smoke prevented movement about the city, removal of bodies, and reconstruction, for several days further.

Aftermath

On the 24th day of the new year, six days after the fire began, monks and others began to transport the bodies of those killed down the Sumida River to Honjo, Sumida, Tokyo, a community on the eastern side of the river. There, pits were dug and the bodies buried; the Ekō-in (Hall of Prayer for the Dead) was then built on the site.

Reconstruction efforts took two years, as the shogunate took the opportunity to reorganize the city according to various practical considerations. Under the guidance of Rōjū Matsudaira Nobutsuna, streets were widened and some districts replanned and reorganized; special care was taken to restore Edo's mercantile center, thus protecting and boosting to some extent the overall national economy. Commoners and samurai retainers alike were granted funds from the government for the rebuilding of their homes, and the restoration of the shōgun's castle was left to be completed last. The area around the castle, as it was restored, was reorganized to leave greater spaces to act as firebreaks; retainers' homes were moved further from the castle, and a number of temples and shrines were relocated to the banks of the river.

One of the greatest disasters in Japanese history, the death and destruction incurred by the Meireki fire was nearly comparable to that suffered in the 1923 Great Kantō earthquake and the 1945 bombing of Tokyo in World War II. Each of these 20th-century events, like the Meireki fire less than three centuries earlier, saw roughly 100,000 deaths, and the destruction of the majority of the city.

In popular culture
The Fire Kimono, a 2008 mystery novel by Laura Joh Rowland, was inspired by the event.

See also
 Fires in Edo
 Great Fire of London (1666)

References

Sources 
Sansom, George (1963). A History of Japan: 1615–1867. Stanford, California: Stanford University Press.

External links 
 

1657 disasters
1657 in Japan
17th-century fires
Edo
Fires in Japan
1657
Urban fires in Asia